Courtland may refer to:

Places in the United States
 Courtland (RTA Rapid Transit station), Cleveland, Ohio
 Courtland, Alabama, a town
 Courtland, Arizona, a ghost town
 Courtland, California, a census-designated place
 Courtland, Kansas, a city
 Courtland, Minnesota, a city
 Courtland, Mississippi, a town
 Courtland, Virginia, a town
 Courtland, Wisconsin, a town
 Courtland Island, a hill on Iona Island (New York) that was once considered separate
 Courtland Township, Michigan
 Courtland Township, Nicollet County, Minnesota
 Courtland Township, Republic County, Kansas

People
 Courtland (name), a list of people with either the surname or given name

Other uses
 Courtland Center, an enclosed shopping mall in Burton, Michigan
 Courtland High School, Spotsylvania County, Virginia
 Hotel Courtland, Canton, Ohio, on the National Register of Historic Places

See also
 Cortland (disambiguation)
 Cortlandt (disambiguation)
 North Courtland, Alabama